Ntokozo Mahlaba (born 11 December 1999) is a South African cricketer. He made his Twenty20 debut for Limpopo in the 2019–20 CSA Provincial T20 Cup on 13 September 2019.

References

External links
 

1999 births
Living people
South African cricketers
Limpopo cricketers
Place of birth missing (living people)